The 1934 UCI Road World Championships took place in Leipzig, Germany.

Events Summary

References

 
UCI Road World Championships by year
W
R
R